This is a list of songs referencing the city of Liverpool, England:

 Heart As Big As Liverpool - The Mighty WAH!
 Back Buchanan Street - The Mersey Wreckers
 Blow the Man Down - sea shanty
 The Reds From Liverpool -The Shanklys 
 Does This Train Stop on Merseyside?  - Amsterdam
 Fearless - Pink Floyd
 Ferry Cross the Mersey - Gerry & the Pacemakers
 Googi the Liverpool Duck - Penny Page
 Going Down to Liverpool - The Bangles
 I Wish I Was Back In Liverpool - The Dubliners
 In My Liverpool Home - Peter McGovern, The Scaffold, The Spinners
 In Liverpool - Suzanne Vega
 Leaving of Liverpool (traditional folk song) - The Pogues, The Dubliners
 Liverpool 8 - Ringo Starr
 Liverpool 8 Medley (Liverpool 8, Children Of The Ghetto, Stanhope Street) - The Real Thing
 Liverpool Blues - The Vipers
 Liverpool Docks by Smokie
 Liverpool, I'll meet you there - Ian Morris
 Liverpool Lullaby - Judy Collins, Cilla Black
 Liverpool Lou - Dominic Behan, The Scaffold
 Liverpool Rain (also album title) - Racoon (Dutch band, 2011)
 Long Haired Lover from Liverpool - Jimmy Osmond
 Maggie May (traditional song) (not to be confused with Rod Stewart's "Maggie May")
 On The Boat To Liverpool - Nathan Carter
 Penny Lane - The Beatles
 Roll, Alabama, Roll (sea shanty) - Bellowhead.
 Rotterdam (Or Anywhere) - The Beautiful South
 Santianna (sea shanty) - The Kingston Trio
 Strawberry Fields Forever - The Beatles
 Streets of Kenny - Shack.
 The Skipper's Lament - John Haines
 Johnny Todd (sea shanty).
 Whiskey on a Sunday - traditional folk song.
 Whip Jamboree (traditional folk song).
 OHM - Pardon Us
 Let's Dance to Joy Division - The Wombats
 Go To Sea Once More - Sea Shanty
 Off To Sea - The Longest Johns
The Water Boys-And A Bang On The Ear
100 miles to Liverpool- Lindisfarne (band).
Liverpool Drive ( St. Louis to Liverpool album) Chuck Berry.

References

Liverpool
Songs
Culture in Liverpool